Putai also known as Marghi West is a nearly extinct Afro-Asiatic language spoken in northeastern Nigeria.  The language is dying out and being replaced by Kanuri.

See also
Marghi Central
Marghi South

Notes

Biu-Mandara languages
Languages of Nigeria
Endangered Afroasiatic languages